The 1948 Cal Poly San Dimas Broncos football team represented the Cal Poly Voorhis Unit—now known as California State Polytechnic University, Pomona—as an independent during the 1948 college football season. Led by first-year head coach Duane Whitehead, Cal Poly San Dimas compiled a record of 6–4. The team outscored its opponents 159 to 158 for the season.

Schedule

References

Cal Poly San Dimas
Cal Poly Pomona Broncos football seasons
Cal Poly Pomona Broncos football